The Scotts Bluff County Courthouse is a historic building in Gering, Nebraska, and the courthouse of Scotts Bluff County, Nebraska. It was built in 1920, and designed in the Classical Revival style, with "symmetric arrangement, monumental shapes, smooth surface finish, a
relatively simple entablature, and colossal columns." It was listed on the National Register of Historic Places in 1990.

It was designed by Denver architect William N. Bowman.

References

National Register of Historic Places in Scotts Bluff County, Nebraska
Neoclassical architecture in Nebraska
Government buildings completed in 1920
County courthouses in Nebraska